John William Mackay (November 28, 1831 – July 20, 1902) was an Irish-American industrialist. Mackay was one of the four Bonanza Kings, a partnership which capitalised on the wealth generated by the silver mines at the Comstock Lode. He also headed a telegraph business that laid transatlantic cables and he helped finance the New York, Texas and Mexican Railway Company.

Life and career

Early years
John William Mackay was born in Dublin to a working-class family. They had a dirt floor hovel shared with a pig. In 1840, the family emigrated to the notorious Five Points slum in lower Manhattan; his father died soon after. As a boy Mackay hawked newspapers such as the New York Herald, and later apprenticed at William H. Webb Shipyard to support his mother and sister.

Gold and silver mining
In 1851, he sailed by clipper around the Horn to California and worked eight years in placer gold fields in Sierra County without much success. In 1859, he went to Virginia City, Nevada, site of the recently discovered Comstock Lode, and there began work at $4 a day laboring in a mine by day and working his own small claims in his spare time. He bought small claims or "feet" and used the proceeds of his labor and finds to buy more feet. In 1865 he used his savings to buy into the Kentucky mine and hit big, he was suddenly worth US$1.6 million, more than enough to retire for life. He then began investing in other mines, sometimes risking everything he had. He formed a business partnership with fellow Irishmen James Graham Fair, James C. Flood, and William S. O'Brien, later known as the Bonanza Kings. The four dealt in mining stocks and operated silver mines, and had a success in the Hale & Norcross mine. In 1871, using proceeds from the Hale & Norcross they bought out a number of smaller mine claims under the name of the Consolidated Virginia Mining Company, and later added the nearby California mine. In 1873, the Con Virginia made the greatest ore body discovery ever found in North America, known as the "Big Bonanza". The strike would pay out US$181 billion in current dollars, with Mackay's portion being about $50 billion. The bonanza was in a location previously overlooked and outside where other strikes had been found. The four-way partnership was more commonly known as the "Bonanza firm". With the proceeds, together they established the Bank of Nevada of San Francisco to compete with the Bank of California.

Marriage
In 1866, he married Marie Louise Hungerford, a native New Yorker. She had their first son in 1870, John W. Mackay, Jr. followed by Clarence H Mackay in 1874.  Snubbed by New York society prior to moving to Virginia City in 1867, and no longer interested in San Francisco by 1874, Louise was moved to Paris with Mackay's blessing after a brief re-attempt at New York life. He purchased a large mansion for her in Paris where his wealth enabled her to become a noted society hostess for two decades, entertaining royalty and throwing lavish parties. The building is today occupied by the Belgium Embassy near the Arc de Triomphe. As his telegraph business expanded, in 1884 the family was moved to London for the boys' schooling and easier communications through his owned cables. 18 years after John's death, Louise returned to the United States in 1920, dying at age 85 in 1928.

Communications companies
In 1884, with James Gordon Bennett, Jr., Mackay formed the Commercial Cable Company, largely to fight Jay Gould and the Western Union Telegraph Company, laid two transatlantic cables, and forced the toll-rate for transatlantic messages down to twenty-five cents a word. In connection with the Commercial Cable Company, he formed in 1886 the Postal Telegraph Company as a domestic wire telegraph company so that Commercial would not need to rely on Western Union to collect and distribute telegraphic messages. Until Mackay and Bennett entered the field, all submarine cable traffic between the United States and Europe went over cables owned by the American financier Jay Gould. A rate war followed that took almost two years to conclude. Jay Gould finally quit trying to run John Mackay out of business. He was quoted as saying in reference to Mackay, "If he needs another million he will go into his silver mines and dig it out".

Once Mackay had conquered the Atlantic with the Commercial Cable Company and North America with the Postal Telegraph Company he turned his sights to laying the first cable across the Pacific. He subsequently formed the Commercial Pacific Cable Company in secret partnership with the Great Northern Telegraph Company and the Eastern Telegraph Company. Although he died in 1902 before his vision was completed, his son Clarence H. Mackay, saw the project through to completion between 1904 and 1906. Commercial Pacific operated a cable line from San Francisco to Manila, Philippines, via Hawaii and Guam, with a subsequent spur that went from Manila to Shanghai, China.

The Mackay System expanded under Clarence H. Mackay's leadership, acquiring several other entities including the Federal Telegraph Company, its radio stations and research laboratories, in 1927.  In 1928, the entire system was bought out by Sosthenes Behn's International Telephone and Telegraph. ITT organized the Postal Telegraph & Cable Corporation as a shell to acquire and control the Mackay System on May 18, 1928.  Though plagued with financial troubles during the Great Depression, the Mackay System continued to be the chief rival of Western Union until 1943. In March of that year, Congress authorized an amendment (Section 222) to the Communications Act of 1934 permitting the merger of the domestic operations of telegraph companies (clearing the way for Western Union to acquire Postal Telegraph).  By May 1943 a merger plan had been put together, which the FCC approved by September, and the merger was completed by October 1943. The international communications (cable and radio) parts of the Mackay System remained with ITT.

Other ventures
The New York, Texas and Mexican Railway was chartered in 1880 by Joseph Telfener and his father-in-law Daniel E. Hungerford. A Texas corporation was formed to take advantage of the state's generous land grants and build a railroad from Richmond to Brownsville. The railroad became known as the "Macaroni Line" because 1,200 Italian immigrants were brought to the United States to build it. Texas passed a law in 1882 voiding any land grants to railroads. In January 1885 Telfener sold the railroad to his brother-in-law Mackay, who sold it to the Southern Pacific Railroad in September that year. The railroad continued to operate under its old name until 1905.

In addition to the Bank of Nevada and the communications companies, Mackay held interests in mines in Colorado, Idaho, and Alaska and timber lands and ranches in California. He owned part of the Spreckels Sugar Company and part of the Sprague Elevator and Electrical Works, and he served as a director of the Canadian Pacific Railway and the Southern Pacific Railroad.

Philanthropy
Mackay was famous for fair dealings with his employees, and gave generously, especially to the charities of the Roman Catholic Church, and endowed the Catholic orphan asylum in Virginia City, Nevada. In June 1908 the Mackay School of Mines building was presented to the University of Nevada, as a memorial to him, by his widow and his son, Clarence H. Mackay.  A statue of John Mackay by Gutzon Borglum stands in front of the Mackay Mines building on the university campus in Reno, Nevada.

Death
Mackay died of heart failure on July 20, 1902, in London. He is buried in Green-Wood Cemetery in Greenwood Heights, Brooklyn; his mausoleum was described in 2018, by Scribner Associate Editor Sarah Goldberg, as "by far the most impressive mausoleum in the cemetery, atop a shady hill". The mausoleum was originally created for Mackay's oldest son, John, Jr., who died in a horse riding accident in 1895. Mackay never fully overcame his grief and was entombed with his son seven years later.

Honours
The town of Mackay, Idaho was named in his honour as he owned the local copper mines. The nearby Mackay Peak in the White Knob Mountains is also named after him. Mackay appears several times as a character in the novel Comstock Lode by Louis L'Amour. In the Steven Spielberg film Indiana Jones and the Last Crusade a ship seen in Venice, Italy in 1938 is named the John W. Mackay.

References

Bibliography

Notes

External links

The Mackay Mansion in Virginia City at Western Mining History
www.atlantic-cable.com/
www.cial.org.uk/
mackayhistory.com/
A Guide to the Consolidated Virginia Mining Company records, NC99. Special Collections, University Libraries, University of Nevada, Reno.

1831 births
1902 deaths
American prospectors
Businesspeople from California
Irish emigrants to the United States (before 1923)
ITT Inc. people
Burials at Green-Wood Cemetery
Businesspeople from New York City
People from Virginia City, Nevada
American mining businesspeople
People from Five Points, Manhattan
19th-century American businesspeople